Joel Jacob (born 8 October 1992) is an Antiguan footballer who plays for Swetes FC and the Antigua and Barbuda national football team.

International career
Jacob made his senior international debut on 22 November 2016 in a 1-0 friendly defeat to Estonia, coming on as a 63rd minute substitute for Shavorn Philip.

References

External links

1992 births
Living people
Antigua and Barbuda footballers
Antigua and Barbuda international footballers
Association football defenders